Patrol Base Jaker in Afghanistan was a military expeditionary base used by the United States Marine Corps and British Army. It was in along the Helmand River Valley in Nawa-I-Barakzayi.  It was originally built by the British Army of Task Force Helmand in 2008. In June 2009, it was transferred to the Marines of 2nd Marine Expeditionary Brigade.  It was also the setting for the documentary film Patrol Base Jaker.

Units
 C Company, 1 RIFLES
 1st Battalion 5th Marines
 11th Marine Regiment Counterbattery RADAR Target Acquisition Platoon LCMR (CBR TAP LCMR) (2009)
 The Black Watch, 3rd Battalion, The Royal Regiment of Scotland (2009)
137 Bty, 40th Regiment Royal Artillery (The Lowland Gunners)
 1st Battalion 3rd Marine Regiment Alpha Company (2009-2010)
 3d Battalion 3d Marine Regiment Kilo Company (2010)
 1st Battalion 9th Marines, Charlie Company (May-Dec 2011)
2nd Battalion 6th Marine Regiment, Golf Company (Dec 2011-June 2012)
Police Mentor Team Mobile Unit (2011)
2d Battalion 3d Marine Regiment (2012)

See also

History of the United States Marine Corps
List of United States Marine Corps installations
List of ISAF installations in Afghanistan

References

Helmand Province
Military installations of the United States in Afghanistan
United States Marine Corps bases
United States Marine Corps in the War in Afghanistan (2001–2021)